Kentucky Route 788 (KY 788) is a  state highway in southern Christian County in the U.S. state of Kentucky. It begins at U.S. Route 41A (US 41A) and heads west along Gate 7 Road. The highway reaches the end of state maintenance at the Fort Campbell.

Major intersections

References

0788
Transportation in Christian County, Kentucky